Emilie König is a citizen of France, who converted to Islam, and who is alleged to have served as a recruiter, once she went to live in the Islamic State. According to the New York Times, she is one of just two women whose financial assets the United Nations has asked member nations to freeze due to suspected ties to terrorism.

König was born in Brittany, France.  Her father was a policeman. She converted to Islam, as a teenager, and started wearing a black abaya and face covering. König has two children from a marriage that ended in divorce.

In 2012, König was the subject of a documentary, Emilie König vs Ummu Tawwab, about French Muslims who wore face coverings.

König traveled to Syria later in 2012, leaving her children in France.  According to the New York Times, she eventually became "a prominent propagandist and recruiter for the Islamic State".

According to Valeurs Actuelles a man named Mohamed Achamlane had founded a group whose goal was ""[T]o curb Islamophobia by channeling the energy of young Muslims who may be tempted by violence" ("Enrayer l’islamophobie en canalisant l’énergie de jeunes musulmans pouvant être tentés par la violence").  However French authorities concluded his group was actually a jihadist group, and raided his home.  The weapons they found, and his correspondence with Konig, were used to convict him.

In late 2017, after years of fighting, the breakaway region Raqqa fell to militias from Kurdistan.  König, and many other followers, fell into Kurdish custody.  She apologized to her family, and to France, and pleaded to be repatriated.  On January 11, 2018, the New York Times profiled her, and described the difficult choices her plea for repatriation posed for policy makers in France.

In November 2019 France TV Info announced that Kurdish forces planned to deport 11 French citizens back to France.  They speculated over who would or wouldn't be deported, noting Konig and two other individuals had been characterized as showing signs of still being dangerously radicalized.

In 2022, König was repatriated back to France from the Al Roj camp in North Eastern Syria by the Kurdish.

References

1984 births
Living people
People from Brittany
Converts to Islam
French Islamists
French propagandists
Islamic State of Iraq and the Levant members
Islamic State of Iraq and the Levant propagandists
French emigrants